Lin Neng-pai is a Taiwanese politician. He was the Minister of Public Construction Commission in 2000–2002.

Education
Lin obtained his bachelor's degree from National Taiwan University and doctoral degree from Ohio State University in the United States.

References

Government ministers of Taiwan
Living people
Year of birth missing (living people)